Russell Peck may refer to:

Russell Peck (scholar), American medievalist and professor
Russell Peck, American composer